HCJ may refer to:

 Hague Convention on Jurisdiction
 Handcrafting Justice, an American fair trade organization
 Heathcote Junction railway station, in Victoria, Australia
 Hechi Jinchengjiang Airport, in Guangxi, China
 High Council of Justice (disambiguation)
 High Court of Justice (disambiguation)